Passeronyssus is a genus of mites in the family Rhinonyssidae. There are about five described species in Passeronyssus.

Species
These five species belong to the genus Passeronyssus:
 Passeronyssus kittacinclae Fain, 1964
 Passeronyssus megaluri Sakakibara, 1968
 Passeronyssus urieli do Amaral, 1973
 Passeronyssus viduae (Fain, 1956)
 Passeronyssus zeferinoi Amaral, 1973

References

Rhinonyssidae
Articles created by Qbugbot